Gajisan is a mountain in South Korea. It sits on the boundary between the city of Ulsan, the city of Miryang in the province of Gyeongsangnam-do, and Cheongdo County in Gyeongsangbuk-do. It is part of the Yeongnam Alps mountain range.

See also
List of mountains in Korea
List of South Korean tourist attractions

Notes

References

 Photos and Map of hiking up Mt. Gaji: http://www.everytrail.com/view_trip.php?trip_id=2026190

External links
 Official website for the Yeongnam Alps

Mountains of Ulsan
Ulju County
Mountains of South Gyeongsang Province
Miryang
Mountains of North Gyeongsang Province
Cheongdo County
Tourist attractions in Ulsan
Mountains of South Korea
One-thousanders of South Korea
Taebaek Mountains